Ayn Issa (also spelled Ain Issa. Meaning Spring of Jesus) is a town in the Tell Abyad District of Raqqa Governorate in Syria. It is located halfway between the Syria–Turkey border town of Tell Abyad and the regional capital Raqqa. Through the city runs the M4 highway connecting Aleppo with the Hasakah Governorate.

Syrian civil war 

In June 2015, Ayn Issa was taken over by the Kurdish People's Protection Units (YPG) militia, Women's Protection Units (YPJ), and the Raqqa Revolutionaries Brigade in the course of their Tell Abyad offensive. While it was shortly recaptured by ISIL militants, it was reclaimed by the YPG in early July. On 14 October 2019, the Syrian Army entered and established joint control over Ayn Issa after an agreement with the SDF to prevent the Turkish offensive in the area. It became the seat of the Autonomous Administration of North and East Syria in September 2018.

Ayn Issa refugee camp 
Since April 2016, the Ayn Issa refugee camp on the outskirts of the town has housed approximately 9,000 refugees by July 2018, mainly Syrian Internally Displaced Persons from the governorates of Deir ez-Zor and Raqqa.

2020–21 Ayn Issa clashes 

On 23 November 2020, clashes broke out between the SNA and SDF near Ayn Issa. On December 1, Lebanon's al-Akhbar newspaper reported that the SDF managed to ambush Turkish-backed forces, killing 30 fighters.

References

Cities in Syria
Populated places in Tell Abyad District